Adolf Schön (8 April 1906 in Wiesbaden, Germany – 2 August 1987 in Frankfurt) was a German racing cyclist.

Palmares

1930
1st stage 7 Deutschland Tour (TTT)
10th Tour de France
1931
1st Six days of Berlin (with Jan Pijnenburg)
1st Six days of Dortmund (with Jan Pijnenburg)
1st Six days of Cologne (with Karl Göbel)
1st Six days of Dortmund (with Jan Pijnenburg)
1st Six days of Berlin 1931 (with Jan Pijnenburg)
1932
1st Six days Frankfurt (with Oskar Tietz)
1933
1st Six days of Brussels (with Jan Pijnenburg)
1st Six days of Cologne (with Karl Göbel)
1st Six days of Dortmund (with Paul Buschenhagen)
1937
1st Six days of Paris (with Kees Pellenaars)
3rd Middle Distance World Championships

References

1906 births
1987 deaths
German male cyclists
Sportspeople from Wiesbaden
Cyclists from Hesse